King Holiday is a single released on January 13, 1986, by the King Dream Chorus and Holiday Crew.  Composed by Phillip Jones, Kurtis Blow, Grandmaster Melle Mel and Bill Adler, it was released in honor of Martin Luther King Jr. Day, which was first celebrated as a national holiday in the United States on January 20, 1986.  All proceeds from the single were donated to the King Center for Nonviolent Social Change.  The single peaked at No.30 on the Billboard Hot Black Singles chart.

The project was spearheaded by Martin Luther King Jr.'s youngest son, Dexter Scott King, who is credited as the song's executive producer.

"King Holiday" was produced by Phillip Jones and Kurtis Blow. The song features:

King Dream Chorus  (vocalists)
El DeBarge
Whitney Houston
Stacy Lattisaw
Lisa Lisa with Full Force
Teena Marie
Menudo: 1986 members: Charlie Masso, Roy Rossello, Robi Rosa, Ray Acevedo, Ricky Martin
Stephanie Mills
New Edition
James "J.T." Taylor
Holiday Crew  (rappers)
Kurtis Blow
The Fat Boys
Grandmaster Melle Mel
Run–D.M.C.
Whodini

References

External links
 King Holiday (1986) - the original mv at Youtube.com

1986 singles
Charity singles
All-star recordings
Songs about Martin Luther King Jr.
1986 songs
Mercury Records singles
PolyGram singles